Dynamatic Technologies is an Indian precision engineering company, based in Bangalore. The company is a global supplier of parts to aerospace, automotive, hydraulic and security assemblers. Udayant Malhoutra is the CEO & Managing Director of the company.

History
Dynamatic Technologies was incorporated in 1973 as a manufacturer of hydraulic pumps. In the 1990s, it expanded to aerospace grade components and aircraft assemblies. In the early 2000s, the company tied up with Hindustan Aeronautics Limited and was involved in fabrication and assembly of HAL's subsonic intermediate training jets. It started making body parts for Sukhoi Su-30MKI and Lakshya jets. It then began supplying flap track beams to Airbus for its A320 family of aircraft and the wide-body 330 aircraft. This followed part contracts with Boeing for Boeing CH-47 Chinook and Bell Textron for Bell 407 helicopters. Dynamatic soon became the supplier of flap track beam assemblies for all of Airbus' single-aisle aircraft and Boeing's P-8 maritime aircraft for Indian, US and Australian navies. In September, 2021 Dynamatic Technologies awarded a contract for manufacturing  Aerostructure Assemblies for Boeing's F-15EX Eagle II Fighter Aircraft.

Acquisitions
In 2008, Dynamatic acquired the British aerospace parts manufacturing company Oldland CNC for 16 million.
In 2011, Dynamatic acquired German automotive component manufacturer Eisenwerke Erla GmbH.

See also
 Automotive industry in India

References

Engineering companies of India
Manufacturing companies based in Bangalore
Companies listed on the National Stock Exchange of India
Companies listed on the Bombay Stock Exchange